North Sandwich is an unincorporated community in the town of Sandwich in Carroll County, New Hampshire. Route 113 continues east into Tamworth, while Route 113A travels north to Wonalancet.

North Sandwich has a separate ZIP code (03259) from other areas in the town of Sandwich.

References

Unincorporated communities in Carroll County, New Hampshire
Unincorporated communities in New Hampshire
Sandwich, New Hampshire